Purushan Enakku Arasan is a 1992 Indian Tamil-language film directed by Rama Narayanan and produced by S. S. Chandran. The film stars Pandiarajan, Kanaka, S. S. Chandran and Pallavi. It was released on 11 February 1992.

Plot

Cast 

Pandiarajan
Kanaka
S. S. Chandran
Pallavi
Nagesh
Chandrasekhar
Gandhimathi
Vennira Aadai Moorthy
Ra. Sankaran
Kovai Sarala
Chinni Jayanth
Radha Ravi
Oru Viral Krishna Rao
Omakuchi Narasimhan

Soundtrack 
The music was composed by Shankar–Ganesh.

Reception 
Malini Mannath of The Indian Express wrote "Pandiarajan being the hero, the script is geared to suit his image and what results is a light-hearted comedy at times funny and many times not". C. R. K. of Kalki praised the director, writer and star cast.

References

External links 
 

1990s Tamil-language films
1992 comedy films
1992 films
Films directed by Rama Narayanan
Films scored by Shankar–Ganesh
Indian comedy films